John Coltrane (1926–1967) was an American jazz saxophonist.

Coltrane may also refer to:

 Coltrane (surname)
 Coltrane (1957 album), an album by John Coltrane from Prestige
 Coltrane (1962 album), an album by John Coltrane from Impulse!
 Coltrane (The Simpsons), a fictional cat from The Simpsons